This Woman may refer to:

 This Woman (LeAnn Rimes album), 2005
 This Woman (K. T. Oslin album), 1988
 "This Woman" (K. T. Oslin song), 1989
 "This Woman" (Kenny Rogers song), 1983
 This Woman (film), a 1924 American film